Tornike Okriashvili (born 12 February 1992) is a Georgian professional footballer who plays for Gagra and the Georgia national team. He plays mainly as an attacking midfielder but also can play as a winger.

Club career
He signed with Russian Premier League side FC Krasnodar on 6 September 2016. His time with Krasnodar was marred by injuries and he was released from his contract by mutual consent on 17 December 2018. He signed with Anorthosis FC in 2019 but his relationship with Klavettas wasn't ideal.

He moved to APOEL on 3 June 2021.

On 15 July 2022, Jeonbuk Hyundai Motors announced that Okriashvili had a signed contract.

On 1 August 2022, Jeonbuk Hyundai Motors announced that Okriashvili's contract was officially terminated by mutual consent due to medical test issue.

Career statistics

Club

International goals
As of match played 8 October 2020. Georgia score listed first, score column indicates score after each Okriashvili goal.

References

External links
  
 
 
 
 

1992 births
Living people
People from Rustavi
Footballers from Georgia (country)
FC Gagra players
FC Krasnodar-2 players
FC Shakhtar Donetsk players
FC Shakhtar-2 Donetsk players
FC Mariupol players
FC Chornomorets Odesa players
K.R.C. Genk players
Eskişehirspor footballers
FC Krasnodar players
Anorthosis Famagusta F.C. players
APOEL FC players
Erovnuli Liga players
Ukrainian Premier League players
Belgian Pro League players
Süper Lig players
Russian Premier League players
Cypriot First Division players
Association football midfielders
Georgia (country) youth international footballers
Georgia (country) under-21 international footballers
Georgia (country) international footballers
Expatriate footballers from Georgia (country)
Expatriate footballers in Ukraine
Expatriate footballers in Belgium
Expatriate footballers in Turkey
Expatriate footballers in Russia
Expatriate footballers in Cyprus
Expatriate sportspeople from Georgia (country) in Ukraine
Expatriate sportspeople from Georgia (country) in Belgium
Expatriate sportspeople from Georgia (country) in Turkey
Expatriate sportspeople from Georgia (country) in Russia
Expatriate sportspeople from Georgia (country) in Cyprus